Liandala Sena Fanai (born 21 November 1993) is an Indian professional footballer who plays as a midfielder for  Minerva Punjab in the I-League.

Career
Born in Mizoram, Fanai began his career with Bethlehem Vengthalang before moving to George Telegraph of the Calcutta Football League in 2016. He soon joined Chennai City of the I-League and made his professional debut for the side on 31 January 2017. He started the match and played the entire first half as Chennai City lost 2–0.

Career statistics

References

1993 births
Living people
People from Mizoram
Indian footballers
Chennai City FC players
Association football midfielders
Footballers from Mizoram
Calcutta Football League players
I-League players